Mammillaria longimamma is a species of cactus from Hidalgo and Querétaro, Mexico.

References

longimamma
Cacti of Mexico
Plants described in 1828